is a 1954 Japanese historical drama film directed by Torajirō Saitō. The title is derived from the kabuki Yoshitsune Senbon Zakura.

Plot

Cast 
 Takashi Wada as Minamoto no Yoshitsune
 Yumiko Hasegawa as Shizuka Gozen
 Kiiton Masuda as Musashibō Benkei
 Kin'ichi Shimizu as Kamei Rokurō
 Shin Morikawa as Suruga Jirō
 Junzaburō Ban as Satō Tadanobu (the fox)
 Chieko Naniwa as Otsuji

External links 

Jidaigeki films
1954 films
1954 drama films
Works about Minamoto no Yoshitsune
Cultural depictions of Minamoto no Yoshitsune
Japanese historical drama films
1950s historical drama films
Japanese black-and-white films
1950s Japanese films